Radical left may refer to:

Political thought
 Radical left-wing politics can (but does not always necessarily) include any of the following:
 Far-left politics
 Radical politics
 Regressive left
 Ultra-leftism
 The left part of radicalism, a political movement which shifted towards the centre during the 20th-century.

Political parties and movements
 In Cyprus
 Committee for a Radical Left Rally (ERAS), a left-wing political party/organization
 In Denmark
 The Danish Social Liberal Party (literally "Radical Left", est. 1905), a social-liberal party
 In France
 Radical Left (France), a liberal parliamentary group during the French Third Republic
 Radical Party of the Left (PRG, est. 1972), a social-liberal party
  (litt. the "Left Radicals", LRDG), split of the PRG around MEP Virginie Rozière, est. 2017
 In Greece
 Syriza or Coalition of the Radical Left (est. 2004), a left-wing political party
 Radical Left Front (MERA, 1999-2009), a former alliance of left-wing political parties

See also 
 
 Radical Party (disambiguation)
 Left Party (disambiguation)
 Antifa (disambiguation)